During the Polish–Soviet War fought from February 1919 to March 1921 between Soviet Russia and the Second Polish Republic – after the conclusion of World War I in Europe – the Polish order of battle included broad disposition of personnel, strength, organization, and command structure.

Formations
The following units and named commanders fought in the Polish–Soviet War on the Polish side.

Polish Military Organisation
Polnische Wehrmacht
Polish I Corps in Russia
1st Cavalry Division (Poland) Commander Juliusz Rómmel
1st Lithuanian–Belarusian Division Parts formed in 1920 the 2nd Lithuanian–Belarusian Division and in 1923 the 19th Infantry Division (Poland)
2nd Lithuanian–Belarusian Division formed in part from 1st Lithuanian–Belarusian Division and formed in 1920 20th Infantry Division (Poland)
1st Legions Infantry Division (Poland) formerly I Brigade of the Polish Legions
Polish 2nd Legions Infantry Division
Polish 3rd Legions Infantry Division
4th Infantry Division (Poland) () {Later renamed 26th Infantry Division (Polish: 26 Dywizja Piechoty)}
5th Rifle Division (Poland) Polish 5th Siberian Rifle Division (also known as the Siberian Division or Siberian Brigade)
1st Siberian Infantry Regiment under Franciszek Dindorf-Ankowicz; later renamed 82nd Siberian Infantry Regiment.
2nd Siberian Infantry Regiment under Józef Werobej.
6th Infantry Division (Poland) Colonel Ignacy Pick.
7th Infantry Division (Poland) (7 DP) Col. Szubert
13th Bde under Herman,
14th Bde under Pogórzelski
7th Artillery Bde under Luberadzki
8th Infantry Division (Poland)
9th Infantry Division (Poland) (interwar)
17th Infantry Brigade
15th Infantry Regiment
22nd Infantry Regiment
18th Infantry Brigade
34th Infantry Regiment
35th Infantry Regiment
9th Artillery Brigade
9th Artillery Regiment
10th Infantry Division (Poland) formerly 4th Rifle Division (Poland) and the 2nd Brigade of the Polish Legions in World War I.
11th Infantry Division (Poland)
12th Infantry Division (Poland)
13th Infantry Division (Poland) (Polish: 13 Kresowa Dywizja Piechoty) formerly 1st Division of Polish Rifles (1 Dywizja Strzelców Polskich)
14th Infantry Division (Poland) aka 14 Greater Poland Infantry Division (Polish: 14 Wielkopolska Dywizja Piechoty) General Filip Dubiski.
15th Infantry Division (Poland) aka 15th "Greater Poland" Infantry Division (Polish: 15 Wielkopolska Dywizja Piechoty)
16th Infantry Division (Poland) aka 16. Pomorska Dywizja Piechoty formed August 16, 1919. Formerly Pomeranian Rifle Division (Polish: 4. Dywizja Strzelców Pomorskich)
 31st Infantry Brigade (under Col. Mischke)
 32nd Infantry Brigade (65th Infantry Regiment without 1,5 battalion; under Krauss)
 16th Artillery Brigade (understrength)
17th Infantry Division (Poland) formed as 3rd Division of Greater Poland Rifles
18th Infantry Division (Poland)(18. Dywizja Piechoty) formed from Haller's Blue Army
(Note: 19th Infantry Division (Poland) not formed until 1923-formed from 1st Lithuanian–Belarusian Division (1918–1923)
20th Infantry Division (Poland)() Colonel Wilhelm Andrzej Lawicz-Liszka {formerly 2nd Lithuanian–Belarusian Division}
21st Mountain Infantry Division (Poland)(Polish: 21 Dywizja Piechoty Górskiej, 21 DPG)
22nd Mountain Infantry Division (Poland)(Polish: 22 Dywizja Piechoty Górskiej, 22 DPG)
23rd Infantry Division (Poland)
24th Infantry Division (Poland)
25th Infantry Division (Poland)
26th Infantry Division (Poland)
27th Infantry Division (Poland)
28th Infantry Division (Poland)
29th Infantry Division (Poland) (Polish: 29. Grodzienska Dywizja Piechoty)
30th Infantry Division (Poland) (Polish: 30. Poleska Dywizja Piechoty)
Individual Units/Regiments:
Polish Air Force
Polish Navy
Lwów Eaglets
Ochotnicza Legia Kobiet
14th Infantry Regiment (Poland) (formed mostly of the former 90th Regiment of the Austro-Hungarian Army. 5th Company commanded by Antoni Chruściel)
36th Infantry Regiment (Poland) aka Infantry Regiment of the Academic Legion
49th Hutsul Rifle Regiment formerly 15th Infantry Rifle Regiment of General Haller's Blue Army. In September 1919 it was renamed to 40th Kresy Infantry Rifle Regiment and changed March 1920 to 49th Hutsul Rifle Regiment
Free Cossack Brigade formerly the Red Army 3rd Don Cossack Cavalry Brigade led by yesaul Vadim Yakovlev

Organisation in Fronts and Armies 

At the time of the Battle of Warsaw (1920), the Polish Army was organised in 3 Fronts and 7 Armies, for a total of 32 divisions:

Fronts:
 Northern Front (Józef Haller de Hallenburg) : 
 5th Army (Władysław Sikorski) 
 1st Army (Franciszek Latinik) 
 2nd Army (Bolesław Roja)
 Central Front (Edward Rydz-Śmigły) :
 4th Army (Leonard Skierski)
 3rd Army (Zygmunt Zieliński)
 Southern Front  (Wacław Iwaszkiewicz) :
 6th Army (Wladyslaw Jedrzejewski)
 Ukrainian Army (Symon Petliura)

Notes

Order of Battle
Orders of battle